Royal Oak Intermediate School is an intermediate school in Auckland, New Zealand. Established on 1 April 1943, it is set in just over 3 hectares of level grounds close to Royal Oak Shopping complex.

The school was originally named Manukau Intermediate School, so called for the school's proximity to the Manukau Harbour. With the growth of Manukau City in recent years, the Board of Trustees decided in 1997 that it was time to affirm that it was an Auckland school: accordingly it was decided to rename the school to "Royal Oak Intermediate" to better reflect its location.

History
Between the years of 1912 and 1922, the area now occupied by the school was the site of the "Boyd Zoo", a major local attraction at the time. Prior to the building being finally commissioned as a school, it was used initially as a temporary hospital during World War II. The school celebrated its Golden Jubilee in 1993. It celebrated its 75th anniversary on 1 April 2018.

Principals
 Henri Binsted 1943–1947
 Frederick Day 1947–1953
 C. Lawrence Brock 1954–1958
 Alexander Aitken 1959–1969
 Eric Boggs 1970–1986
 Graham Smith 1987–1989
 Don Cochrane 1990–1999
 Christopher Nixon 2000–2007
 Darryl Connelly 2007–2012
 Derek Linlington 2012–2017
 Ross Devereux 2017–2018
 Tony Coughlan 2019–present

Houses
Royal Oak Intermediate has 4 houses; Binsted, Grainger, Jordan and Buchanan. They were named after the 4 founders of the school. Henri Binsted (Principal on 1 April 1943 – 1947), Cecil Grainger, William Jordan and Robert Buchanan.

References

Educational institutions established in 1943
Intermediate schools in Auckland
1943 establishments in New Zealand